Port Philip may refer to:

Port Philip, Nova Scotia

See also
Port Phillip
Port Phillip (disambiguation)